Rare Species is the tenth studio album by the Finnish avant-garde progressive metal band Waltari.

Track listing

 "One Day" - 4:09
 "Life Without Love" - 3:59
 "Megacity Rain" - 4:49
 "Dreamworld" - 4:09
 "What I Really Know" - 4:30
 "My Pain" - 5:19
 "Quick as a Day" - 4:54
 "Dream" - 5:13
 "Alone" - 5:47
 "Live This!" - 5:21
 "Wasting My Mind" - 4:31
 "No Limit" / "Your Funky Rhythm" / "Symphony of Destruction"
 "Guardian Angel" (limited edition bonus track, 2001) - 3:36
 "Living Then Living Now" (limited edition bonus track, 2001) - 2:35
 "New Church" (limited edition bonus track, 2001) - 3:31
 "There's No Tomorrow" (limited edition bonus track, 2001) - 1:56

All music by Hatakka–Waltari, lyrics by Hatakka, except No Limit by Wilde/Coster/Slijngaard/Dels and Symphony of Destruction by Dave Mustaine.

No Limit originally performed by 2 Unlimited.

Symphony of Destruction originally performed by Megadeth.

Credits
Kärtsy Hatakka - Vocals, bass, programming
Sami Yli-Sirniö - Guitar
Jariot Lehtinen - Guitar
Mika Järveläinen - Drums

Charts

References

External links
Encyclopaedia Metallum page

Waltari albums
2004 albums